In mathematics, a Lagrangian foliation or polarization is a foliation of a symplectic manifold, whose leaves are Lagrangian submanifolds. It is one of the steps involved in the geometric quantization of a square-integrable functions on a symplectic manifold.

References
 Kenji FUKAYA, Floer homology of Lagrangian Foliation and Noncommutative Mirror Symmetry, (2000)

Symplectic geometry
Foliations
Mathematical quantization